Riccardo Calcagni (born 27 June 1994) is an Italian professional footballer who plays as a midfielder for  club Novara.

Club career
Calcagni started his senior career for Eccellenza club San Sisto.

On 23 September 2020, he joined Matelica.

The next season, on 7 July 2021, he signed with Viterbese.

On 15 July 2022, Calcagni moved to Novara on a two-year deal.

References

External links
 
 

1994 births
Living people
Sportspeople from Perugia
Footballers from Umbria
Italian footballers
Association football midfielders
Serie C players
Serie D players
Lucchese 1905 players
U.S. Città di Pontedera players
F.C. Arzignano Valchiampo players
S.S. Matelica Calcio 1921 players
U.S. Viterbese 1908 players
Novara F.C. players